Notable societies for education and learning in Manchester, England, have included:

Manchester Literary and Philosophical Society, founded 1781
Royal Manchester Institution, founded 1823
Manchester Mechanics' Institute, founded 1824
Manchester Statistical Society, founded 1833
Manchester Athenaeum, founded 1835
Chetham Society, founded 1843
Lancashire and Cheshire Antiquarian Society, founded 1883
Manchester Geographical Society, founded 1884

Manchester-related lists
Education in Manchester